Demographics in Georgia has two primary meanings:

 Demographics of Georgia (country), a country in the Caucasus
 Demographics of Georgia (U.S. state), a state in the United States of America

See also
Georgia (disambiguation)